Abortion in Alaska is legal at all stages of pregnancy, as long as a licensed physician performs the procedure. 63% of adults said in a poll by the Pew Research Center that abortion should be legal in all or most cases. Alaska was one of only four states to make abortion legal between 1967 and 1970, a few years before the US Supreme Court's decision in 1973's Roe v. Wade ruling. Alaska had consent requirements for women seeking abortions by 2007 that required abortion providers to warn patients of a link between abortion and breast cancer.

The number of abortion clinics in Alaska has been declining, going from fourteen in 1982 to thirteen in 1992 to three in 2014. 1,547 abortions took place in Alaska in 2014 and 1,459 took place in 2015. For poor women, there is state funding for abortions. Both abortion rights activists and anti-abortion rights activists are present in the state, and have held protests in 2019.

History 

Alaska, California, and New Hampshire did not voluntarily provide the Center for Disease Control with abortion related data in 2000 or 2001. In 2014, 63% of adults said in a poll by the Pew Research Center that abortion should be legal in all or most cases with 34% stating it should be illegal in all or most cases.

Legislative history 
Alaska, Hawaii, Washington and New York were the only four states that made abortion legal between 1967 and 1970 that did not require a reason to request an abortion. In 1970, the state repealed some of its abortion laws along with Hawaii, New York, and Washington. The following year, Alaska repealed its statute that said inducing an abortion was a criminal offense. State law still required in 1971 that any woman getting a legal abortion in the state needed to be a resident for some specific period between 30 and 90 days.

Some states, such as Alaska, Mississippi, West Virginia, Texas, and Kansas, have passed laws requiring abortion providers to warn patients of a link between abortion and breast cancer, and to issue other scientifically unsupported warnings. The state was one of 23 states in 2007 to have a detailed abortion-specific informed consent requirement. Alaska and Minnesota both require that women seeking abortions after 20 weeks be informed that, while experts disagree on the issue of whether or not a fetus can feel pain at 20 weeks, it is possible. This expert confusion written into the law is there despite a Journal of the American Medical Association conclusion that pain sensors do not develop in the fetus until between weeks 23 and 30.

House Bill 250 was introduced 2017 by Rep. David Eastman (R-Wasilla). The bill was called the Life at Conception Act and it never made it out of committee in Alaska's House. In 2017, Washington State, New Mexico, Illinois, Alaska, Maryland, Massachusetts, Connecticut, and New Jersey allow by state law qualified non-physicians to prescribe drugs for medical abortions only. In May 2019, Eastman introduced House Bill 178, which defines abortion as "murder of an unborn child"; the bill was never heard before a committee.

In 2022, Governor Mike Dunleavy expressed interest in an amendment to the Alaska Constitution clarifying the legality of abortion in the state.

Judicial history 
The US Supreme Court's decision in 1973's Roe v. Wade ruling meant the state could no longer regulate abortion in the first trimester.

In 1997, the Alaska Supreme Court ruled in Valley Hospital Association Inc. v. Mat-Su Coalition for Choice that the privacy clause of the Alaska Constitution protects the right to an abortion. This ruling remains in effect after the US Supreme Court overruled Roe v. Wade in 2022.

Clinic history 

Between 1982 and 1992, the number of abortion clinics in the state decreased by 1, going from 14 in 1982 to 13 in 1992. In 2014, there were 3 abortion clinics in the state. 90% of the counties in the state did not have an abortion clinic. That year, 37% of women in the state aged 15–44 lived in a county without an abortion clinic. In March 2016, there were 4 Planned Parenthood clinics in the state. There were still 4 Planned Parenthood clinics the following year, all of which offered abortion services, in a state with a population of 167,815 women aged 15–49.

Statistics 
In 1990, 69,000 women in the state faced the risk of an unintended pregnancy. In 2013, among white women aged 15–19, there were 130 abortions, 10 abortions for black women aged 15–19, 20 abortions for Hispanic women aged 15–19, and 70 abortions for women of all other races. In 2017, the state had an infant mortality rate of 5.6 deaths per 1,000 live births.

Abortion financing 
17 states including this one use their own funds to cover all or most "medically necessary" abortions sought by low-income women under Medicaid, 13 of which are required by State court orders to do so. In 2010, the state had 835 publicly funded abortions, of which were zero federally and 835 were state funded.

Abortion rights views and activities

Protests 
Women from the state participated in marches supporting abortion rights as part of a #StoptheBans movement in May 2019. Hundreds of women attended a rally in Anchorage at Town Square Park to protest legislation proposed in Alaska's House to restrict abortion rights. The event was organized by Planned Parenthood Votes and Alaska ACLU. There was another rally at the Alaska Capitol in Juneau in May 2019 in opposition to the bill proposed by Republican Rep. David Eastman of Wasilla.

Anti-abortion views and activism

Views 
Rep. David Eastman (R-Wasilla) was censured by the Alaska Legislature in 2017 after he said women used Medicaid support for abortion to a "free trip to the city".

Protests 
A small counter protest was organized by anti-abortion rights activists at the Alaska Capitol in Juneau in May 2019 in support of proposed restrictions on women's ability to access legal abortions in the state.

References 

Alaska
Healthcare in Alaska
Women in Alaska